Massimo Di Giorgio (born 22 March 1958) is a former Italian high jumper, who won three medals at senior level at the International athletics competitions.

Biography
He finished fifteenth at the 1978 European Indoor Championships, won the gold medal at the 1979 Mediterranean Games and won a bronze medal at the 1983 European Indoor Championships. His personal best jump is 2.30 metres, achieved in June 1981 in Udine.

1980 Moscow Olympics boycott
Italian athletes serving in its military corps could not attend the Games, however, because of the national government's official support of the boycott. In 1980 Massimo Di Giorgio, like other leading Italian athletes (the swimmer Marcello Guarducci, the modern pentathlete Daniele Masala and the judoka Ezio Gamba) who in Moscow in 1980 would have had medal ambitions, could not participate in those Olympic Games because belonged to military bodies. Ezio Gamba resigned from the military body in time and was able to participate in the Games under the IOC flag, it was not so for the others.

The day when the winners of the Olympic gold medals, Pietro Mennea, Sara Simeoni and Maurizio Damilano were appointed Knights of the Italian Republic by the Italian President Sandro Pertini, Di Giorgio and Guarducci went to protest at the Quirinale because they believed that they too would had to have equal recognition.

The candidacy for President of FIDAL
In 2004, at the age of 46, Massimo di Giorgio decided to propose his candidacy as President of the Italian Athletics Federation (FIDAL), he was then defeated by the former Italian middle-distance runner Franco Arese.

National records
 High jump: 2.25 m ( Nova Gorica, 15 April 1979)
 High jump: 2.26 m ( Udine, 20 May 1979)
 High jump: 2.27 m ( Bologna, 19 September 1979)
 High jump: 2.29 m ( Pisa, 5 July 1980)
 High jump: 2.30 m ( Udine, 15 June 1981) since 21 July 1988 (Luca Toso sets 2.32 m)

Achievements

National titles
Massimo Di Giorgio has won 7 times the individual national championship.

Italian Athletics Championships
High jump: 1979, 1980, 1982 (3)

Italian Athletics Indoor Championships
High jump: 1978, 1979, 1982, 1983 (4)

See also
 Men's high jump Italian record progression
 Italian all-time top lists - High jump

Notes

References

External links
 

1958 births
Living people
Athletics competitors of Fiamme Oro
Italian male high jumpers
Athletes (track and field) at the 1979 Mediterranean Games
Mediterranean Games medalists in athletics
Mediterranean Games gold medalists for Italy
Sportspeople from Udine